The 1937 All-Ireland Junior Hurling Championship was the 20th staging of the All-Ireland Junior Championship since its establishment by the Gaelic Athletic Association in 1912.

Westmeath entered the championship as the defending champions, however, they were beaten in the Leinster Championship.

The All-Ireland final was played on 3 October 1937 at Croke Park, between Dublin and London, in what was their first meeting in a final in five years. Dublin won the match by 7-08 to 3-06 to claim their second championship title overall and the first title since 1932.

Results

All-Ireland Junior Hurling Championship

All-Ireland semi-finals

All-Ireland home final

All-Ireland final

References

Junior
All-Ireland Junior Hurling Championship